

V10A Anti-inflammatory agents

V10AA Yttrium (90Y) compounds
V10AA01 Yttrium (90Y) citrate colloid
V10AA02 Yttrium (90Y) ferrihydroxide colloid
V10AA03 Yttrium (90Y) silicate colloid

V10AX Other anti-inflammatory therapeutic radiopharmaceuticals
V10AX01 Phosphorus (32P) chromicphosphate colloid
V10AX02 Samarium (153Sm) hydroxyapatite colloid
V10AX03 Dysprosium (165Dy) colloid
V10AX04 Erbium (169Er) citrate colloid
V10AX05 Rhenium (186Re) sulfide colloid
V10AX06 Gold (198Au) colloidal

V10B Pain palliation (bone seeking agents)

V10BX Various pain palliation radiopharmaceuticals
V10BX01 Strontium (89Sr) chloride
V10BX02 Samarium (153Sm) lexidronam
V10BX03 Rhenium (186Re) etidronic acid
V10XX05 Lutetium (177Lu) vipivotide tetraxetan

V10X Other therapeutic radiopharmaceuticals

V10XA Iodine (131I) compounds
V10XA01 Sodium iodide (131I)
V10XA02 Iobenguane (131I)
V10XA03 Iodine (131I) omburtamab
V10XA53 Tositumomab/iodine (131I) tositumomab

V10XX Various therapeutic radiopharmaceuticals
V10XX01 Sodium phosphate (32P)
V10XX02 Ibritumomab tiuxetan (90Y)
V10XX03 Radium (223Ra) dichloride
V10XX04 Lutetium (177Lu) oxodotreotide

References

V10
Medicinal radiochemistry